Nocardioides furvisabuli is a Gram-positive and rod-shaped bacterium from the genus Nocardioides which has been isolated from black beach sand from the Samyang Beach on Jeju Island, Korea.

References

External links
Type strain of Nocardioides furvisabuli at BacDive -  the Bacterial Diversity Metadatabase	

furvisabuli
Bacteria described in 2008